Suresh Nanda is an Indian businessman, former Lt. Commander for the Indian navy, and the Chairman of Claridges Group of Hotels. He ran Dynatron Services, an engineering firm before entering into the hospitality sector.

Business career 
After 15 years of Military service, Nanda started his journey in the corporate sector and working for several major ventures in India, Europe and the Middle East. In 2003, Nanda facilitated the acquisition of Claridges Hotel in New Delhi and the Nabha Palace Hotel in Mussoorie.  Subsequently, he built Vivanta Surajkund which is managed by Indian Hotels Limited.  He then went international as a hotelier by building Taj Dubai in 2015.

Early life
Suresh Nanda was born to Admiral Sardarilal Mathradas Nanda and Sumitra Nanda in Karachi, British India. As the son of a high rank officer in the Indian Navy, Suresh Nanda studied in St. Columba's School, Delhi, the same school where notable personalities like Shah Rukh Khan, Rahul Gandhi, Sanjay Gandhi and Officers of the Indian Armed Force like Rana Chhina, Arun Khetarpal and  DS Hooda had studied.

Issues in media 
Nanda was implicated in the Tehelka sting operation West End for allegedly giving bribes in Barak Missile Deal Scandal which was later closed as no evidence was found in the case, the Central Bureau of Investigation (CBI) filed a closure after seven years, in 2013.

Allegations
Nanda had floated three companies including Dynatron and Crown. These manufacture and deal mostly with armoury vehicles, arms and associated equipment. In the First Information Report filed 9 October 2005, CBI mentioned large payments from the firm MTU Aero Engines (a supplier to Israel Aircraft Industries) into the bank accounts of Dynatron Services, a company managed by Suresh Nanda and his family members during the relevant period. The scandal had resulted in Nanda serving time in prison and his passport being revoked; however, according to the media his company's business increased following these events.

References

Living people
Indian Navy officers
Businesspeople from Delhi
Arms traders
Defence industry of India
Corruption in defence procurement in India
1941 births